Troy Tompkins, known as Troy CLE, is an American fiction writer from East Orange, New Jersey. He is the author of The Marvelous Effect, the first book in The Marvelous World Saga. The book follows young African-American protagonist Louis Proof. The book was released by Simon & Schuster and Random House on May 22, 2007. In which he received a six figure book deal.  Troy is a graduate of Seton Hall Preparatory School and New York University (NYU).

His writing influences include Hip hop, Video games, Anime, and Science-Fiction

Works 
 The Marvelous Effect (2007)
 Olivion's Favorites (2009)

External links
 Marvelous World.com
 Troy CLE's Facebook Page
 Troy CLE's Myspace Site
 Troy CLE in The New York Times 
 Troy CLE on "The Tavis Smiley Show"
 Troy CLE on PBS's "NOW"
 Troy CLE on King Magazine's Web SIte
 Troy CLE on CBS
 Troy CLE on BET
 Troy CLE Interviewed by Scholastic Reporter Jaime Sanders
 Troy CLE on AOL
 Troy CLE on Vibe.com
 Troy CLE on News Channel 12

References 

Living people
1970s births
21st-century American novelists
New York University alumni
Writers from East Orange, New Jersey
Seton Hall Preparatory School alumni
American male novelists
21st-century American male writers
Novelists from New Jersey